Coatue is an American technology-focused investment manager led by founder and portfolio manager Philippe Laffont. 
Coatue invests in public and private markets with a focus on technology, media, telecommunications. the consumer and healthcare sectors.
Coatue has offices in New York City, Menlo Park, California, London, Shanghai and Hong Kong.

History
Philippe Laffont graduated from MIT in 1991 in computer science. He worked as an analyst for McKinsey & Company from 1992 to 1994 in Madrid, Spain. After working as an independent consultant, he joined Tiger Management LLC as a research analyst in 1996, focusing on telecommunications stocks.

In 1999, Laffont founded Coatue making him a member of the Tiger Cubs employees who founded their own hedge funds. Coatue launched its first hedge fund in 1999 with $45 million in capital. Coatue manages this fund in addition to others. Thomas Laffont is the firm’s co-founder and leads Coatue’s private equity investing.

Coatue's annual "East Meets West" conference features tech entrepreneurs from the U.S. and China.

Funds

Investments
Some of Coatue's notable investments include the following:

 Airtable
 Ant Financial
 Anaplan
 ByteDance
 Chime
 Dapper Labs
 Databricks
 DoorDash
 Instacart
 Meituan
 OpenSea
 Snap Inc.
 SoFi 
 Spotify
 Abacus.AI

References

External links 

 https://www.coatue.com (Company Website)

Tiger Management
Hedge funds
Hedge fund firms in New York City
American companies established in 1999
Financial services companies established in 1999
Financial services companies based in New York City
Investment companies based in New York City